Lydia Bailey is a 1952 American historical film directed by Jean Negulesco, based on the novel of the same name by Kenneth Roberts. It stars Dale Robertson and Anne Francis.

Plot
In 1802, lawyer Albion Hamlin travels from Baltimore to Cap François in Haiti. He wants to obtain the signature of Lydia Bailey, whose late father left his large estate to the United States government, who needs the money. Haiti is in turmoil because Napoleon Bonaparte is trying to reclaim control of the island.

Albion heard that Lydia will be with her fiancé, Col. Gabriel D'Autremont. Albion is shocked when his young guide, Nero, is killed by men trying to steal his luggage.

Albion learns that the D'Autremonts are living at their country chateau inland. He is knocked unconscious, and wakes up to find out he was knocked out by King Dick, an educated man who supports Toussaint L'Ouverture.

He reluctantly follows him to the D'Autremonts, and finally meets up with Lydia Bailey. Lydia consents to sign Albion's documents but Napoleons troops arrive and war breaks out. They struggle to get through the jungle back to the American ship in the bay and finally make it to the ship with King Dick's help.

Partial cast

Dale Robertson as Albion Hamlin
Anne Francis as Lydia Bailey
Charles Korvin as Col. Gabriel D'Autremont
William Marshall as King Dick
Luis Van Rooten as General Charles LeClerc
Adeline de Walt Reynolds as Antoinette D'Autremont
Angos Perez as Paul D'Autremont
Bob Evans as Soldier
Gladys Holland as Pauline Bonaparte
Will Wright as Consul
Roy E. Glenn as Mirabeau
Ken Renard as Toussaint L'Ouverture
Juanita Moore as Marie
Carmen de Lavallade as Specialty dancer
Jack Cole as Dancer
Martin Wilkins as Voodoo priest
Albert Morin as Lieutenant
William Washington as Deckhand
Clancy Cooper as Codman
Muriel Bledsoe as Ametiste
Mildred Boyd as Marmeline
Marjorie Elliott as Rosida
Suzette Harbin as Floreal
Roz Hayes as Aspodelle
Dolores Mallory as Claircine
Lena Torrence as Attenaire
Frances Williams as Cloryphene
Ken Terrell as Barbe
Louis Mercier as Millet
William Walker as General La Plume

Production

Original novel
The novel was Roberts' first since Olivier Wiswell in 1940. It was published in January 1947. The New York Times called it "an entertaining chronicle" with a "preposterous plot". The book became a best seller.

Development
20th Century Fox first obtained the rights to Kenneth Robert's novel in September 1946, prior to the book being published. They paid $215,000 for a ten-year "lease" on the novel. Fox representatives said they had not even read the book, basing their sale on Roberts' reputation and an outline. William Perlberg was assigned to be producer. The following month that job was given to Sol Siegel. Gene Tierney was the first star announced.

Filming was pushed back after the British government introduced a tax on Hollywood films. This meant the loss of profits in England, which would be crucial in what would be an expensive movie. (Fox also delayed production of other costume pictures which would be expected to make money in Britain, including The Black Rose, Julie and Down the Sea to the Ships).

In April 1948 the project was reactivated, with plans to make the movie using "frozen" funds owed to Fox in England and the Bahamas. In June Fox announced that Philip Dunne was writing a screenplay, and Linda Darnell would likely play the title role.

However filming did not proceed. By May 1949 Susan Hayward, who had signed to Fox, was being mentioned as a star. In September Zanuck said the film would go into production "shortly".

In February 1950 Fox said Tyrone Power would play the male lead. Plans t film in Haiti were delayed by disturbances in that part of the world. In November Jules Shernberg was appointed producer. Micheline Prelle was announced as star.

In June 1951 Power refused the role.
Power said he had filmed five historical-period films in a row and wished to do a film where "people talk normally and not in stilted dialogue."

Errol Flynn claimed he was slapped in a bar by Canadian millionaire Duncan McMartin which he said aggravated a spinal injury and meant he was unable to take part in the film. He sued McMartin in the Bahamas Supreme Court for £80,000, which included his reported fee for Lydia Bailey, $200,000. The court awarded Flynn $14,000 in damages.

The lead was given to one of Fox's postwar contract players, Dale Robertson.  Another contractee, Anne Francis, played Lydia.

Jean Negulesco signed to direct it under a new four-year deal with Fox.

Shooting
With Fox's option on the novel running out, the film was shot at the 20th Century Fox Movie Ranch and backlot of Fox's California studios.

This was also the film debut of William Marshall.

References

External links

1952 films
American historical adventure films
1950s historical adventure films
Films directed by Jean Negulesco
20th Century Fox films
Films based on historical novels
Films scored by Hugo Friedhofer
Films set in Haiti
Films set in the 1800s
Films based on American novels
Films with screenplays by Philip Dunne
Cultural depictions of Toussaint Louverture
Haitian Revolution films
1950s English-language films
1950s American films